The Door is the debut studio album by Norwegian trumpeter, composer and multi-instrumentalist Mathias Eick recorded in 2007 and released on August 19, 2008 by the ECM label. The album consists of eight weightlessly lyrical compositions, all originals.

Reception
The Allmusic review by Thom Jurek awarded the album 3½ stars stating "This is an excellent introduction to a player who has plenty to say and many ways of saying it. The Door is a beautifully mysterious and deeply satisfying entry in the ECM canon and a very auspicious debut".  Brendon Griffin of PopMatters commented "If there’s a flaw in The Door, it lies in the strength of its opening salvo, an usustainable flow of raw communication which dissipates as it plays out. Perhaps Eick should’ve apportioned the dynamism and intensity of those first three tracks more equitably, but then that might’ve diminished the law of first impressions. If those do indeed count, Mathias Eick is destined for as long, rich and triumphantly plaintive a career as any of his pedigree’d compatriots." John Kelman of All About Jazz added "With his warm tone, selfless allegiance to the collective, and personal nexus of lyrical form and freedom, Eick is the most important trumpeter to emerge from the Scandinavian scene since Henriksen and Molvær. Dogmatic in conception, The Door is all human in nature, delivering mightily on the promise of Eick's earlier ECM appearances."

Track listing
All compositions by Mathias Eick
 "The Door" - 7:56 
 "Stavanger" - 6:59 
 "Cologne Blues" - 8:46 
 "October" - 4:40 
 "December" - 4:44 
 "Williamsburg" - 7:23 
 "Fly" - 4:35 
 "Porvoo" - 4:13 
Recorded at Rainbow Studio in Oslo, Norway in September 2007.

Personnel
 Mathias Eick - trumpet, guitar, vibraphone
 Jon Balke - piano, Fender Rhodes
 Audun Erlien - electric bass, guitar
 Audun Kleive - drums, percussion
 Stian Carstensen - pedal steel guitar (tracks 3-5)

References

ECM Records albums
Mathias Eick albums
2008 albums
Albums produced by Manfred Eicher